Martin Edward Reynolds (born 22 February 1949) is a former British track and field athlete who competed mainly in the 200 metres.

Athletics career
He competed for Great Britain at the 1972 Summer Olympics held in Munich, Germany where he won the silver medal with his team mates Alan Pascoe, David Hemery and David Jenkins in the men's 4x400 metres relay event.

He had to switch to the 400 metres in the Olympic year which was also the year of his final exams at university. He competed in more 400 metres events at Munich than he had done in his entire career up to that point.

He represented England and won a bronze medal in the 4 x 100 metres relay, at the 1970 British Commonwealth Games in Edinburgh, Scotland.

References

Living people
1949 births
British male sprinters
English male sprinters
Olympic athletes of Great Britain
Olympic silver medallists for Great Britain
Athletes (track and field) at the 1972 Summer Olympics
Commonwealth Games medallists in athletics
Athletes (track and field) at the 1970 British Commonwealth Games
Medalists at the 1972 Summer Olympics
Olympic silver medalists in athletics (track and field)
Commonwealth Games bronze medallists for England
Universiade medalists in athletics (track and field)
Universiade gold medalists for Great Britain
Medalists at the 1970 Summer Universiade
Members of Thames Valley Harriers
Medallists at the 1970 British Commonwealth Games